The Volkswagen e-Beetle is a modified automobile first shown in October 2019 at IAA in Frankfurt. A donor Volkswagen Type 1303 Super Beetle convertible was updated by replacing the original petrol drivetrain with the electric motor, transmission, and battery used in the e-Up. Parts were taken from the regular Volkswagen production line, and installed by specialist partner  in Renningen after consulting with Volkswagen Group Components.

Design and development
Externally, the e-Käfer may be distinguished from a classic Beetle by the car's running boards; these are thicker on the e-Käfer to conceal the depth of the floor-mounted battery pack. The converted car retains the original rear-drive, rear-motor layout.

Performance
A larger battery, 45 kWh, and an uprated motor, are available at extra cost.

The converted e-Beetle weighs .

Production
The upgraded battery and motor are also available for an extra .

 intend for the technology in the battery-electric conversion to be applied to other classic Volkswagen products. In March 2020, Volkswagen Commercial Vehicles showed the e-BULLI, a conversion of a 1966 T1 Samba Bus performed by  using the same e-Up drivetrain as the e-Beetle, distinct from prior electrified Volkswagen small concept vans such as the Bulli (2011), BUDD-e (2016), and ID.BUZZ (2017). The e-BULLI battery is slightly larger than the e-Beetle battery, at 45 kWh, but the range remains the same .

References

External links

Cars introduced in 2019
E-Beetle